C. stigmaeus may refer to:

Chaunax stigmaeus, the redeye gaper, an anglerfish species
Citharichthys stigmaeus, the speckled sanddab, a flatfish species